Falenty  is a village in the administrative district of Gmina Raszyn, within Pruszków County, Masovian Voivodeship, in east-central Poland.

The village has a population of 690.

References

External links
 Jewish Community in Falenty on Virtual Shtetl

Falenty